Collectin-10, also known as collectin liver 1, is a collectin protein that in humans is encoded by the COLEC10 gene. Its structure is similar to mannan-binding lectin (MBL).

Collectin liver 1 (CL-L1) show very similar carbohydrate selectivity as MBL. Two other discovered collectins include collectin placenta 1 (CL-P1) and collectin kidney 1 (CL-K1). CL-L1's location found to be on chromosome 8 q23-24.1. Research concluded CL-L1 to be a serum protein.

References

External links 
 

Collectins